Gillmeria armeniaca is a moth of the family Pterophoridae that is found in Armenia, Russia, Kazakhstan and Iran.

References

Moths described in 1984
Platyptiliini
Moths of Asia